Harri Toivonen (born 22 October 1960) is a former rally and race car driver from Finland. He is the younger brother of the late Henri Toivonen and son of Pauli Toivonen.

Rally career

His first World Rally Championship outcome was at the 1980 1000 Lakes Rally in Finland driving a Chrysler Avenger, former car of his brother Henri.

In 1983 he drove a Mitsubishi Lancer Turbo, mainly for the Finnish Junior Rally Team. In 1986 he came to a deal with the Austin Rover works team to drive the British Rally open in an MG Metro 6R4. While competing at the Wales Rally in early May, he heard the news of his brother's accident at the Tour de Corse which cost Henri and co-driver Sergio Cresto their lives.

Harri continued competing later that year. He drove his Metro to 8th place at the 1000 Lakes Rally, but retired at the UK's RAC Rally in November. The rally his brother Henri won one year earlier.

After some unsuccessful years in rallying after 1986, he switched to circuit racing. He drove in several racing classes with some successes. He participated in the 24 Hours of Le Mans in 1991 finishing 9th overall, driving a Porsche 962 for Kremer Racing with JJ Lehto and Manuel Reuter.

In 2002, Toivonen hung up his helmet as a full-time driver. In 2006, he opened an exhibition to tribute to his brother Henri at the Neste Oil Rally Finland.

Harri is now involved with Ian's Dawsons Le Mans Prototype Eco Racing Team.

Racing record

Complete WRC results

24 Hours of Le Mans results

External links 
  Site dedicated Henri Toivonen

1960 births
Finnish rally drivers
Finnish racing drivers
World Rally Championship drivers
Living people
24 Hours of Le Mans drivers
American Le Mans Series drivers
World Sportscar Championship drivers
Multimatic Motorsports drivers
24 Hours of Daytona drivers